Total Abandon: Australia '99 is a double live album and DVD by British hard rock band Deep Purple, recorded at Melbourne Park in Melbourne, Australia on 20 April 1999. When the album was released in September 1999, it was only available in Australia. From 12 October 1999, it was made available as a mail order merchandise in Europe. Later, it was also sold in music stores. In USA, the album was not released until 2012; this edition was cut to only one disc.

The album was accompanied in Australia by two collector edition singles: "Smoke on the Water" with disc cut into shape of the Australian continent, and "Black Night", which disc was manufactured in shape of the DP logo.

The VHS/DVD was originally available only in Australia and as a mail order merchandise. It was released in the US on 16 May 2000. It was re-released in Europe in 2003 with additional documentary A Band Down Under which previously had been released only on VHS. The 1999 DVD edition of the album went platinum in Australia becoming Deep Purple's commercially most successful DVD/video release in that country.

Track listings

1999 edition
All songs written by Ritchie Blackmore, Ian Gillan, Roger Glover, Jon Lord, and Ian Paice except where noted.

CD one
"Ted the Mechanic" (Gillan, Steve Morse, Glover, Lord, Paice) - 4:50
"Strange Kind of Woman" - 6:23
"Bloodsucker" - 4:56
"Pictures of Home" - 8:19
"Almost Human" (Gillan, Morse, Glover, Lord, Paice) - 6:16
"Woman from Tokyo" - 6:47
"Watching the Sky" (Gillan, Morse, Glover, Lord, Paice) - 5:46
"Fireball" - 4:44
"Sometimes I Feel Like Screaming" (Gillan, Morse, Glover, Lord, Paice) - 7:11
"Steve Morse Guitar Solo" (Morse) - 8:42
"Smoke on the Water" - 9:01 - includes riffs from following songs in the beginning (unlisted):
 "Heartbreaker" (John Bonham, John Paul Jones, Jimmy Page, Robert Plant)
 "Whole Lotta Love" (Bonham, Willie Dixon, Jones, Page, Plant)
 "Fire" (Jimi Hendrix)
 "Crossroads" (Robert Johnson)
 "Day Tripper" (Lennon–McCartney)
 "You Really Got Me" (Ray Davies)

CD two
"Lazy" - 8:49
"Perfect Strangers" (Gillan, Blackmore, Glover) - 6:18
"Speed King" - 14:28
"Black Night" - 6:21
"Highway Star" - 7:16

2012 edition
"Ted the Mechanic" - 4:50
"Strange Kind of Woman" - 6:23
"Bloodsucker" - 4:56
"Pictures of Home" - 8:19
"Almost Human" - 6:16
"Woman from Tokyo" - 6:47
"Watching the Sky" - 5:46
"Fireball" - 4:44
"Sometimes I Feel Like Screaming" - 7:11
"Smoke on the Water" - 9:01
"Black Night" - 6:21
"Highway Star" - 7:16

DVD track listing
"Intro"
"Ted the Mechanic" - 4:34
"Strange Kind of Woman" - 6:21
"Bloodsucker" - 4:57
"Pictures of Home" - 8:18
"Almost Human" - 6:32
"Woman from Tokyo" - 6:25
"Watching the Sky" - 5:42
"Fireball" - 4:45
"Sometimes I Feel Like Screaming" - 7:05
"Steve Morse Guitar Solo" - 11:37
"Smoke on the Water" - 5:57
"Lazy" - 8:50
"Perfect Strangers" - 6:19
"Speed King" - 15:14
"Black Night" - 6:17
"Highway Star" - 8:05

Limited edition singles
 1999 - "Smoke on the Water (Radio Mix)" / "Smoke on the Water (Enhanced Video)"
 1999 - "Black Night" / "Fireball"

Personnel
Deep Purple
Ian Gillan - vocals
Steve Morse - guitar
Jon Lord - keyboards
Roger Glover - bass
Ian Paice - drums

Production
Darren Schneider - production
Drew Thompson - executive production
Mat Gearing Thomas - mixing

Certifications

References

Concert films
1999 live albums
1999 video albums
Live video albums
Deep Purple live albums
EMI Records live albums
Eagle Records live albums
Eagle Records video albums
Deep Purple video albums